Bruno Bruyere (born 31 December 1965) is a Belgian former professional racing cyclist. He rode in the 1988 Tour de France.

References

External links
 

1965 births
Living people
Belgian male cyclists
Cyclists from Brussels